Der Herr ist mit mir (The Lord is on my side), BuxWV 15, is a cantata by Dieterich Buxtehude. It is scored for two violins, violone, basso continuo, and four voices (soprano, alto, tenor, basso). The text is taken from Psalm 118 (6-7).

Text

Recordings
6 Cantatas, Orchestra Anima Eterna & The Royal Consort, Collegium Vocale, Jos van Immerseel — 1994 — Channel Classics CCS 7895
Festival Baroque, Ottawa Bach Choir, Lisette Canton

See also
List of compositions by Dieterich Buxtehude

External links
A 60-second sample (of the Alleluia section) at the Ottawa Bach Choir website

Church cantatas
Compositions by Dieterich Buxtehude
German church music